The Man Outside is a 1967 British spy thriller film directed by Samuel Gallu and starring Van Heflin, Heidelinde Weis and Pinkas Braun. It was first exhibited in Austria and West Germany in 1967, and then in Britain the following year. The story is based on the 1959 novel Double Agent by Gene Stackelberg. The film's sets were designed by the art director Peter Mullins.

Synopsis
A disgraced former CIA agent attempts to bring a Russian defector safely to his former bosses.

Cast
 Van Heflin as Bill MacLean  
 Heidelinde Weis as Kay Sebastian  
 Pinkas Braun as Rafe Machek  
 Peter Vaughan as Nikolai Volkov  
 Charles Gray as Charles Griddon  
 Paul Maxwell as Judson Murphy  
 Ronnie Barker as George Venaxas  
 Linda Marlowe as Dorothy  
 Gary Cockrell as Brune Parry  
 Larry Cross as Austen  
 Bill Nagy as Morehouse
 Carole Ann Ford as Cindy

References

Bibliography
 Burton, Alan. Looking-Glass Wars: Spies on British Screens since 1960. Vernon Press, 2018.
 Taylor, Tadhg. Masters of the Shoot-'Em-Up: Conversations with Directors, Actors and Writers of Vintage Action Movies and Television Shows. McFarland, 2015.

External links

1967 films
1967 drama films
1960s spy drama films
Allied Artists films
British spy drama films
Cold War spy films
Films based on American novels
Films scored by Richard Arnell
Films directed by Samuel Gallu
Films set in London
1960s English-language films
1960s British films